Ethiopia competed at the 2013 World Championships in Athletics from August 10 to August 18 in Moscow, Russia.
A team of 46 athletes was
announced to represent the country
in the event. Ethiopia finished 6th at the Medal Table.

Results

(q – qualified, NM – no mark, SB – season best)

Men

Women

References

Nations at the 2013 World Championships in Athletics
2013 in Ethiopian sport
Ethiopia at the World Championships in Athletics